The first season of the television series Sonny with a Chance aired on Disney Channel from February 8, 2009 to November 22, 2009, and included 21 episodes. It introduces the six main characters of the series which are Sonny Munroe (Demi Lovato), Tawni Hart (Tiffany Thornton), Chad Dylan Cooper (Sterling Knight), Nico Harris (Brandon Mychal Smith), Grady Mitchell (Doug Brochu), and Zora Lancaster (Allisyn Ashley Arm). 

Recurring cast members and guest stars this season include Michael Kostroff, Nancy McKeon, Vicki Lewis, Kelly Blatz, Selena Gomez, Eden Sher, G. Hannelius, Daniel Roebuck, Steve Hytner, Robert Adamson, Christina Moore and Jeff Dunham.

Production
Episode taping began on September 15, 2008 and ended on March 23, 2009. Episodes were taped on Stage 11 at NBC Studios in Burbank, California.

Opening sequence
The opening sequence (which slides in from the top of the screen at the end of the teaser scene) begins with a shot of a ringing telephone, which Sonny picks up. After presumably getting the call from Hollywood to appear on So Random!, she screams into the phone, drops it and quickly packs a suitcase. The background suddenly changes from Sonny's bedroom to an airplane headed to California (though this portion contradicts a statement in the pilot episode by Sonny's mother Connie that they drove from Wisconsin to California). It continues by showing Sonny in L.A., then showing shots of the other characters (Tawni, who does a quick shine of a star with her picture on it; Chad looking out the window in the back of a limousine; Grady and Nico messing around; and Zora, atop of a mechanical monster machine she is controlling). The sequence ends with the entire cast walking together then stopping and posing, which then switches to Sonny walks next to the show's title logo where she knocks it into place, timed exactly while Sonny says "Yow!" just before the theme ends, in a manner similar to the end of the That's So Raven opening titles.

Episodes

References

External links

2009 American television seasons
Season 1